The Treviso Marathon (Italian: Maratona di Treviso) is an annual road running event which is held in March in the area around the Province of Treviso in Italy.

History
The Treviso Marathon was launched in 2004 and an initiative where any runner completing the distance under six hours received free entrance saw the race attract over 3000 runners, placing it as the fifth largest marathon in Italy that year. The race continued to attract large numbers of runners after its inaugural edition and over 3700 people finished the 4th edition of the race in 2007.
The event played host to the Italian championship race for the first time in 2009, with Italians Migidio Bourifa and Laura Giordano claiming both the race titles and national titles.

The course has a point-to-point format, beginning at Via Cavour near Viale della Vittoria in Vittorio Veneto and finishing within the city of Treviso at Porta San Tommaso in Piazza del Grano. Along its very flat, southerly route, it passes the towns of Conegliano, Susegana, Nervesa della Battaglia, Spresiano and Villorba. The course is certified by the Association of International Marathons and Distance Races.

The race attracts domestic elite level marathon runners, other European athletes and also Moroccan, Ethiopian and Kenyan runners. The course records were set in 2007, with Benjamin Pseret holding the men's best time of 2:10:18 and Shitaye Gemechu holding the women's record of 2:28:03 hours.

The 2020 edition of the race was postponed due to the COVID-19 pandemic, with the event likely being rescheduled for 2020.09.20.

Past winners
Key:

References

External links
Official website
Marathon Info profile

Marathons in Italy
2004 establishments in Italy
Recurring sporting events established in 2004
Sport in Treviso
Spring (season) events in Italy